Aminabad (also Romanized as Amīnābād; also known as Kalāteh-ye Amīnābād and Kalāteh-ye Ḩājjī Bābā) is a village in Kharturan Rural District, Beyarjomand District, Shahrud County, Semnan Province, Iran. At the 2006 census, its population was 59, in 13 families.

References 

Populated places in Shahrud County